Julie Ann or Julie Anne may refer to:

Julie Ann Emery, American actress
Julie Ann Taylor, American voice actress
Julie Anne Smith, American actress professionally known as Julianne Moore
Julie Anne San Jose, Filipina singer-songwriter
Julie Anne Genter, New Zealand politician
Julie Anne Haddock, American former child actress